Kyle Colby Jones is an American voice actor, director, script writer and producer at Sentai Filmworks. He is known for producing and directing English dubs, as well as adapting scripts for Japanese anime and live-action films. He has directed on Full Metal Panic!, UFO Ultramaiden Valkyrie, Air, Kanon, and Log Horizon. He directed Akame ga Kill! and Parasyte -the maxim- which were both broadcast on Adult Swim. He is also credited as K.C. Jones when voice acting. Outside of working in anime, he is also a freelance photographer and copywriter.

Filmography

Anime

Film

References

External links
  
 

American male voice actors
American voice directors
People from Dallas
Living people
Television producers from Texas
Film producers from Texas
American television writers
American male screenwriters
American male television writers
American male video game actors
Screenwriters from Texas
Year of birth missing (living people)